Iheanacho Obioma is a Nigerian politician and member of the 4th National Assembly representing Ikwuano/Umuahia North/Umuahia South constituency of Abia State under the umbrella of the People's Democratic Party between 1999 and 2003.

He later went on to contest for a seat in the Nigerian Senate to represent Abia Central Senatorial district under the flagship of the All Progressives Congress against the then incumbent governor Theodore Orji.

See also
 Nigerian National Assembly delegation from Abia

References

People from Abia State
Living people
Igbo politicians
Peoples Democratic Party members of the House of Representatives (Nigeria)
Year of birth missing (living people)